The Institution of Environmental Sciences (IES) is a professional body (professional association) in the United Kingdom. The organisation is a registered charity with the object of "to advance environmental protection and improvement by promoting a scientific approach to understanding and ensuring the conservation of the physical and natural environment" and "advance the education of the public by the provision of research and coordination of education, and to engage with those professionally concerned with environmental work, education or studies."

IES is a constituent body of both the Society for the Environment (SocEnv), and the Science Council which enables IES members to progress Registered Environmental Technician, Chartered Environmentalist and Chartered Scientist status

History
The Institution of Environmental Sciences was founded as a result of an initiative by Dr John Rose during a series of meetings held during 1971-1972 at the Royal Society in London and chaired by Lord Burntwood.

Affiliations
The IES is a member of the Society for the Environment and the Science Council.

The IES provides administration for two other organisations. The Committee of Heads of Environmental Science who accredit programmes of study in universities and to support and promote the discipline in higher education and the Institute of Air Quality Management.

Publications
The IES produces a number of publications:

 environmental SCIENTIST journal, sent quarterly to members and available open access three-months after publication. Articles are written by experts and professionals working in the environmental field. Each issue examines a topic of importance to environmental science; an expert in the area acts as guest editor, introducing the articles and providing an overview of the subject at hand.  
 occasional reports on issues in the environmental science sector
 guidance for professionals working in environmental science

See also
 Chartered Environmentalist
 Chartered Scientist

References

External links
 IES website
 IAQM website

Environmental organisations based in the United Kingdom
Environmental organizations established in 1971
Environmental science
Organisations based in the City of London
Environmental Sciences